Deacon Peak is a peak,  high, marking the summit of Penguin Island, at the east side of the entrance to King George Bay, in the South Shetland Islands. It was charted in 1937 by Discovery Investigations personnel on the Discovery II, who named it for Sir George E.R. Deacon.

References
 

Mountains of the South Shetland Islands